San Ignacio is a town and municipality in Misiones Province in north-eastern Argentina.

Sister cities

San Ignacio is twinned with:

 San Ignacio, Paraguay

References

Populated places in Misiones Province